Acacia catenulata, commonly known as bendee, is a tree belonging to the genus Acacia and the subgenus Juliflorae that is endemic to some arid areas in  Australia.

Description
Like most species of Acacia it has phyllodes rather than true leaves. After flowering pale brown flat seed pods form that are contracted between each of the seeds.

Taxonomy
It was first formally described by the botanist Cyril Tenison White in 1944 as part of the work Contributions to the Queensland Flora as published in the Proceedings of the Royal Society of Queensland. It was reclassified as Racosperma catenulatum by Leslie Pedley in 1987 and transferred back to genus Acacia in 2001.

There are two recognized subspecies
 Acacia catenulata subsp. catenulata
 Acacia catenulata subsp. occidentalis

Distribution
It is native to an area of the Pilbara region of Western Australia centred around Newman where it is commonly found on scarps composed of weathered sediments growing in shallow soils. It only has a limited distribution in the Northern Territory but is quite common in central and southern Queensland.

See also
 List of Acacia species

References

catenulata
Acacias of Western Australia
Plants described in 1944
Taxa named by Cyril Tenison White